Sideway (pronounced "Sideway") is an area of Stoke-on-Trent, approximately one mile south west of Stoke-upon-Trent, Stoke-on-Trent, in Staffordshire, England. It is located on the junction of the A500 and the A50 adjacent to the Bet365 Stadium.

The area around the stadium was formerly a spoil tip for the Hem Heath Colliery, which closed in the mid-1990s; the stadium itself opened in 1997. The surrounding area has also been redeveloped and is home to a hotel, restaurant, health club and a number of car dealerships.

Sideway is also home to a Michelin factory, a medium wave transmitter for Absolute Radio, Greatest Hits Radio Staffordshire & Cheshire and BBC Radio Stoke, and the base of Marcroft Engineering, a railway wagon repair company.

It also has two lakes which are controlled by Fenton and District Angling Society. Known as the Overflow complex. http://www.fentonanddistrictanglingsociety.co.uk/waters/overflow-complex-sideway/

There are proposals to build a park and ride station in this area, taking advantage of its location on the A500 and A50.

References

http://tx.mb21.co.uk/gallery/sideway.php

Areas of Stoke-on-Trent